Royale is a Canadian brand of consumer household paper products such as facial tissue, bathroom tissue, paper towel, and paper napkins.

History 
In 1929, New York-based National Cellulose Company dissolved a relationship with its Canadian distributor and opened its first Canadian office in downtown Toronto In 1936, Toronto businessman William S. Gibson and a team of investors bought out National Cellulose and Dominion Cellulose was formed.  Dominion Cellulose continued to sell its Facelle tissue in Canada until 1961 when the company was sold to Canadian International Paper Company and was renamed Facelle Company. Facelle Company launched its Royale brand in 1963 with two products; 3-ply facial tissue, and 2-ply bathroom tissue.

In August 1991 the Royale brand was sold to Procter & Gamble where it remained until 2001 when Irving Tissue purchased P&G’s Weston Road plant in Toronto, Ontario along with the rights to the Royale brand.

The Royale Kittens 

The Royale brand is represented by the Royale Kittens, two white Persian kittens who embody the Kitten-y softness of Royale products. They first appeared in a 1973 television commercial which ran until 1984. Since then, the Kittens have appeared in television, print, and Internet marketing material for Royale. In 2010, an official Facebook community page was created in the name of the Royale Kittens.

Advertising 

Royale’s longest running television ad campaign ran from 1973 to 1984, and featured the Royale Kittens playing on a white shag rug and unwinding rolls of bathroom tissue. Other memorable campaigns include Royale’s “The Nose” spot featuring pro hockey player Eddie Shack.

References 

Tissue products endure a turbulent time in North America – Perini Journal
http://www.wildlifeservices.co.uk/files/tissue.pdf 
50 years of kitten’y softness | The Times
New Irving generation broadens horizons – The Globe and Mail

External links 
 

Canadian brands
Paper products
Personal care brands